James Venter (born 21 August 1996) is a South African professional rugby union player for the  in Super Rugby, the  in the Currie Cup and the  in the Rugby Challenge. His regular position is flanker or number eight.

References

External links
 itsrugby.co.uk profile

South African rugby union players
Living people
1996 births
People from Port Shepstone
Rugby union flankers
Golden Lions players
Lions (United Rugby Championship) players
Sharks (rugby union) players
Sharks (Currie Cup) players
Rugby union players from KwaZulu-Natal